Rhyncholepis is an extinct genus of anaspida from the Late Silurian. It was 26 cm long.

Fossils have been found in southern Norway.

References 

Fossil taxa described in 1911
Birkeniiformes genera
Silurian jawless fish
Fossils of Norway